The French Navy has operated four submarines named Narval (Fr. “Narwhal”) 

 , a pioneering submarine of the late 19th century
 , ex-Italian submarine Bronzo (an ), captured by the Royal Navy and transferred to the FNFL in 1944
 , lead ship of the Narval-class submarines of the 1950s

French Navy ship names